Air Excel is an airline based in Arusha, Tanzania offering both scheduled and air charter services.

Destinations
Scheduled flights are operated to the following destinations:

Fleet
The Air Excel fleet consists of the following aircraft:

References

External links

 Official website

Airlines of Tanzania
Airlines established in 1997
1997 establishments in Tanzania